Anania intinctalis is a moth in the family Crambidae. It was described by Harrison Gray Dyar Jr. in 1920. It is found in Mexico.

References

Moths described in 1920
Pyraustinae
Moths of Central America